Crash Kings is an American rock band formed in Los Angeles, California in 2006. The members are vocalist–keyboardist Antonio "Tony" Beliveau, his brother, bassist Mike Beliveau, and drummer Tom Roslak. The band's debut album, Crash Kings, was released May 26, 2009, on Custard/Universal Motown. The first single, "Mountain Man", came out on U.S. modern rock radio stations in October and entered Billboard's Alternative Songs chart the following month. It reached #1 on the Billboard Alternative Radio charts in March 2010. The band is known for using analog keyboards, such as the clavinet, with distortion effects and a whammy bar, in place of a typical lead guitar.

History
Brothers Mike and Tony Beliveau grew up in Andover, Massachusetts, a suburban city north of Boston. Tony started playing piano by age six, and began to write music during middle school. After high school, he briefly studied jazz piano at the University of North Texas before deciding to return to Boston and ultimately attend the Berklee College of Music, where younger brother Mike was already a student. After Berklee and relocating to Los Angeles, Tony sent Mike (who had relocated to New York) some recorded tracks he had been working on. Impressed with the tracks and Tony's singing, Mike packed up and moved to LA a week later.

A few months after the band's formation, Crash Kings drew the attention of songwriter and record producer Linda Perry, who met with Tony and signed the group to her label, Custard Records.
After the band performed for Sylvia Rhone, president of Universal Music Group's Motown Records, Crash Kings were directed to Dave Sardy, who produced the band's eponymous debut album for Custard/Universal Motown.
Released on May 26, 2009,
it reached number 30 on Billboard's U.S. Top Heatseekers albums chart.
The album's first single, "Mountain Man", entered the Billboard Alternative Songs chart in November and peaked at #1 on March 28, 2010.
The band has toured with such artists as Chris Cornell,
Anberlin,
Stone Temple Pilots,
David Cook,
Jet,
The Bravery,
Mason Jennings,
and Rooney.

Crash Kings have since released a second album, titled Dark of the Daylight, raising funds for the project via the Kickstarter platform.

Band members
 Antonio Beliveau – lead vocals, piano, clavinet, keyboards
 Mike Beliveau – bass, backing vocals
 Tom Roslak – drums, percussion

Discography

Studio albums

Singles

References

Alternative rock groups from California
American musical trios
Musical groups from Los Angeles
Musical groups established in 2006
Custard Records artists
Universal Motown Records artists
Republic Records artists